The 2005 NCAA Division I Men's Swimming and Diving Championships were contested in March 2005 at the University Aquatic Center at the University of Minnesota in Minneapolis, Minnesota at the 82nd annual NCAA-sanctioned swim meet to determine the team and individual national champions of Division I men's collegiate swimming and diving in the United States.

Auburn again topped the team standings, finishing 77 points ahead of Stanford. It was the Tigers' third consecutive and fifth overall national title.

Team standings
Note: Top 10 only
(H) = Hosts
(DC) = Defending champions
Full results

See also
List of college swimming and diving teams

References

NCAA Division I Men's Swimming and Diving Championships
NCAA Division I Swimming And Diving Championships
NCAA Division I Men's Swimming And Diving Championships
NCAA Division I Men's Swimming and Diving Championships